Joypurhat Sugar Mill is the largest government owned sugar mill factory in Bangladesh. It is located at the north-western Joypurhat district in Rajshahi division. It has the capability of thrashing 14,000 metric tons of sugarcane daily.

History
Joypurhat Sugar Mill was established in 1963 on 100 acre in Joypurhat town. During the Bangladesh Liberation war, the mill was used by Pakistan army as a base. The military set up a court and tried prisoners held there. The prisoners were sentenced to death and executed in the mill. The factory is the largest government owned sugar mill in Bangladesh. Since 1990 the mill has been experiencing loses. The workers in the mill are represented by Joypurhat Sugar Mill Workers Union. In March 2015 sugar farmers and suppliers protested the non payment of dues by the mill. The mill blamed it on poor sales and overstocking of sugar.

Pollution 
In March 2015, Environmentalist accused the factory of polluting the Chhoto Jamuna River and killing thousands of fish in the river.  Thousands of people near the plant have fallen sick from water that was contaminated by factory waste. The plant does not have a treatment plant for effluents.

References

Further reading
 
 
 
 
 
 
 
 
 
 
 
 
 
 
 
 
 
 
 
 
 
 
 
 
 
 
 
 
 
 
 
 
 
 

Buildings and structures in Rajshahi Division
1963 establishments in East Pakistan
Sugar mills in Bangladesh